Tu Ali-ye Sofla (also Romanized as Tū ‘Alī-ye Soflá, Toloo Ali Soflā, and Ţow 'Ali-ye Soflá; also known as Ţow ‘Alī Pā’īn, Tuali, Tuālī Ashaghī, and Tūlī ‘Ashāqī) is a village in Minjavan-e Sharqi Rural District, Minjavan District, Khoda Afarin County, East Azerbaijan Province, Iran. At the 2006 census, its population was 354, in 76 families.

In the wake of White Revolution (early 1960s) a clan of Mohammad Khanlu tribe, comprising 50 households,  used Tu Ali-ye Sofla as their winter quarters.

References 

Populated places in Khoda Afarin County
Kurdish settlements in East Azerbaijan Province